Eldar Azimzade (25 May 1934 – 20 January 2003) was a Soviet football referee from Azerbaijan.

Azimzade's biggest refereeing event was the final match of 1980 Olympic tournament between Czechoslovakia and East Germany. The score was: 

Czechoslovakia 1 : 0 East Germany

References

1934 births
2003 deaths
Sportspeople from Shusha
Soviet football referees
Azerbaijani football referees
Football referees at the 1980 Summer Olympics